Coles is an unincorporated community in Coles County, Illinois, United States.

References

Unincorporated communities in Coles County, Illinois
Unincorporated communities in Illinois